Heart Island is an island in the Town of Alexandria within the Saint Lawrence River, along the northern border of the U.S. state of New York, in Jefferson County. The island is one of the most prominent within the Thousand Islands archipelago, which stretches from New York State to Canada.

Heart Island is home to Boldt Castle, which is open to the public as a tourist attraction.

Islands of the Thousand Islands in New York (state)
Islands of Jefferson County, New York